Maxim Mikhailovich Vylegzhanin (born 18 October 1982) is a Russian former cross country skier and a three-time Olympic silver medalist at the 2014 Sochi Olympics in 50 km freestyle, 4 × 10 km relay and team sprint. He was stripped of his 2014 Olympic medals by the International Olympic Committee (IOC) on 9 November 2017, however on 1 February 2018, his results were restored as a result of the successful appeal. 

Vylegzhanin has competed since 2002. His first World Cup start was on 22 January 2005 in Pragelato, Italy. He won a silver medal in the 50 km event (time: 1:59:38:8 – average speed 25,1 km/h) at the FIS Nordic World Ski Championships 2009 in Liberec.

Career
Vylegzhanin's best individual World Cup finish was first place in the 30 km in La Clusaz in December 2010. He has a total of four victories ranging from pursuit to 50 km between 2007 and 2008, all in lesser events. He also finished eighth in the 4 x 10 km relay at the 2010 Winter Olympics in Vancouver, British Columbia, Canada.

Doping case
In December 2016, the International Ski Federation provisionally suspended six Russian cross-country skiers due to doping violations during the 2014 Winter Olympics, including Vylegzhanin. In December 2017, Vylegzhanin was disqualified for doping offences by the International Olympic Committee, and his 2014 Olympic results were annulled. In February 2018, the international Court of Arbitration for Sport 
reinstated Vylegzhanin results in Sochi 2014, including three medals, and annulled disqualification imposed by IOC. On 19 January 2019 the IOC's appeal of Vylegzhanin case was dismissed by the Swiss Federal Tribunal.

Cross-country skiing results
All results are sourced from the International Ski Federation (FIS).

Olympic Games
 3 medals – (3 silver)

World Championships
 5 medals – (1 gold, 3 silver, 1 bronze)

World Cup

Season standings

Individual podiums

 7 victories – (5 , 2 )
 24 podiums – (15 , 9 )

Team podiums
 4 victories – (2 , 2 )
 10 podiums – (8 , 2 )

References

External links
 
 
 
 Zeit online
 Cross Country Canada
 xc-ski.de

1982 births
Living people
People from Sharkansky District
Cross-country skiers at the 2010 Winter Olympics
Cross-country skiers at the 2014 Winter Olympics
Olympic cross-country skiers of Russia
Russian male cross-country skiers
FIS Nordic World Ski Championships medalists in cross-country skiing
Universiade medalists in cross-country skiing
Recipients of the Order of Honour (Russia)
Tour de Ski skiers
Russian sportspeople in doping cases
Doping cases in cross-country skiing
Competitors stripped of Winter Olympics medals
Universiade gold medalists for Russia
Cross-country skiers at the 2007 Winter Universiade
Olympic silver medalists for Russia
Sportspeople from Udmurtia